The 78th Air Refueling Squadron  is part of the 514th Air Mobility Wing at McGuire Air Force Base, New Jersey.  It operates the KC-46A Pegasus aircraft conducting aerial refueling missions as a reserve associate of the 305th Air Mobility Wing.

The unit was first activated as a Douglas C-47 Skytrain transport unit that saw combat with the 435th Troop Carrier Group in Western Europe. The squadron flew paratroopers on airborne assaults on Normandy (Operation Overlord); Southern France (Operation Dragoon); the Netherlands (Operation Market Garden), and Germany (Operation Varsity). It also flew combat resupply missions in the relief of Bastogne in 1945.  The 78th was awarded a Distinguished Unit Citation for its actions during the Normandy invasion.

The squadron was activated in the reserve in 1947.  It was called to active duty in March 1951 for the Korean War, serving at its home station, Miami International Airport.  It returned to reserve duty in December 1952, but it was activated in 1954. The squadron was activated again in 1955 as part of a program to improve recruiting by spreading reserve units to smaller population centers.

History

World War II

The squadron was first activated at Bowman Field, Kentucky in February 1943, as one of the original squadrons of the 435th Troop Carrier Group.  The group used Douglas C-47 Skytrains and Douglas C-53 Skytrooopers in preparing for duty overseas with Ninth Air Force.

The 78th left the United States in October 1943, arriving at RAF Langar, England, in early November.  On arrival, it began training for participation in the airborne operation over Normandy.  The squadron flew its first combat missions on D-Day by dropping paratroopers of 101st Airborne Division near Cherbourg Naval Base.  The unit towed Waco CG-4A and Airspeed Horsa gliders carrying reinforcements to the same location that afternoon and on the following morning.  The squadron received a Distinguished Unit Citation for its part in Operation Overlord, the Normandy invasion.

The squadron began transport services following the landings in France and intermittently engaged in missions of this type until V-E Day In these operations the 78th hauled supplies such as serum, blood plasma, radar sets, clothing, rations, and ammunition.  It also evacuated wounded personnel to Allied hospitals.

The squadron interrupted these supply and evacuation missions to train for and participate in three major airborne assaults. It was part of a detachment of three squadrons from the 435th Group that moved to Tarquinia Airfield, Italy in July 1944 for Operation Dragoon, the invasion of Southern France. The detachment dropped paratroopers over the assault area on 15 August and also released gliders carrying troops and equipment such as jeeps, guns, and ammunition.  The following day it flew a resupply mission over France, then transported supplies to bases in Italy before returning to England at the end of the month.

In September 1944 the squadron participated in Operation Market Garden the unsuccessful airborne operation intended to seize bridges across the Meuse River in the Netherlands, dropping paratroops of the 82d and 101st Airborne Divisions and releasing gliders carrying reinforcements. During the Battle of the Bulge, the unit delivered supplies to isolated combat positions of the 101st Airborne and 7th Armored Divisions in Bastogne and Marcouray, Belgium.

The unit moved to Bretigny Airfield, France in February 1945 to prepare for Operation Varsity, the airborne assault across the Rhine River.  Each squadron aircraft participating in this operation towed two gliders transporting troops and equipment to the east bank of the Rhine near Wesel on 24 March.  The unit then flew resupply missions to Germany in support of ground forces.

The squadron transported supplies to occupation forces in Germany and evacuated Allied prisoners of war after V-E Day.  The squadron and the 435th Group returned to the United States in August and the group was inactivated on 15 November 1945.

Reserve troop carrier operations

The squadron was once again activated as a reserve unit under Air Defense Command at Imeson Field, Florida on 17 July 1947.  It was again assigned to the 435th Troop Carrier Group, located at Morrison Field, Florida.  The squadron was nominally a Curtiss C-46 Commando unit, but it is not clear to what extent it was equipped with tactical aircraft while at Imeson.

In June 1949, Continental Air Command, which had assumed the responsibility for training reserve units from Air Defense Command in 1948, reorganized its reserve units under the wing base organization system. As part of this reorganization and unit reductions required by President Truman's reduced 1949 defense budget, the 435th Group and its squadrons moved to Miami International Airport, where it was assigned to the newly formed 435th Troop Carrier Wing and formed its cadre from elements of the inactivating 100th Bombardment Group.  Air Force flying operations at Imeson came to a temporary end.  The squadron was manned at only 25% of the strength of a regular unit.

At Miami, the squadron trained with C-46s under the supervision of the active duty 2585th Air Force Reserve Training Center. The squadron was ordered into active service in March 1951 as a result of the Korean War.  Along with other reserve troop carrier units called to active duty, it formed Tactical Air Command's Eighteenth Air Force.  The squadron's initial function was to train C-46 aircrews for service in Korea. The 78th also trained with Fairchild C-119 Flying Boxcars.  Although it remained at Miami, the unit deployed twice while on active duty: to Laurinburg-Maxton Airport, North Carolina from 21 July until 1 September 1951 and to Grenier Air Force Base, New Hampshire from 2 January to 3 March 1952. It was relieved from active duty and inactivated on 1 December 1952 and its mission, personnel and equipment were transferred to the regular 746th Troop Carrier Squadron, which was activated the same day.

The squadron was activated as a reserve unit the same day at the same station, but with the personnel and equipment of the inactivating 814th Troop Carrier Squadron. In the reserve, the squadron once again flew the Curtiss Commandos.

Reserve airlift and air refueling operations
August 1962 – March 1972, during which times it often augmented Military Airlift Command's strategic airlift operations worldwide and took part in domestic training exercises.  The squadron also served in an active status from, March 1951 – December 1952 and October 1961 – August 1962.  Between April 1972 and October 1973, it performed a special operations role.  In November 1981, the 78th began strategic aerial refueling and airlift operations.  In December 1989 it refueled aircraft on way to Panama during Operation Just Cause.  During Operation Desert Shield in 1990, its crews refueled more than a hundred aircraft on their way from the United States to the Persian Gulf area and delivered passengers and cargo.

Campaigns and decorations
 Campaigns. World War II: Rome-Arno; Normandy; Northern France; Southern France; Rhineland; Ardennes-Alsace; Central Europe.
 Decorations. Distinguished Unit Citation: France 5–7 Jun 1944. Air Force Outstanding Unit Awards: 1 August 1967 – 25 October 1968; 1 Oct 1984 – 30 Aug 1986; 1 October 1995 – 30 September 1997. Republic of Vietnam Gallantry Cross with Palm: 1 April 1966 – 31 March 1972; 26–28 Oct 1972

Awards

Lineage
 Constituted as the 78th Troop Carrier Squadron on 30 January 1943
 Activated on 25 February 1943
 Inactivated on 15 November 1945
 Activated in the reserve on 17 July 1947
 Redesignated 78th Troop Carrier Squadron, Medium on 26 June 1949
 Ordered to active service on 1 March 1951
 Inactivated on 1 December 1952
 Activated in the reserve on 1 December 1952
 Inactivated on 24 March 1954
 Activated in the Reserve on 1 April 1955
 Inactivated on 16 November 1957
 Activated in the Reserve on 8 May 1959
 Redesignated 78th Troop Carrier Squadron, Heavy on 8 May 1961
 Ordered to active service on 1 October 1961
 Relieved from active duty on 27 August 1962
 Redesignated 78th Air Transport Squadron, Heavy on 1 December 1965
 Redesignated 78th Military Airlift Squadron on 1 January 1966
 Redesignated 78th Special Operations Squadron on 1 April 1972
 Inactivated on 1 October 1973
 Redesignated 78th Air Refueling Squadron, Heavy (Associate) on 25 March 1981
 Activated in the Reserve on 1 November 1981
 Redesignated 78th Air Refueling Squadron (Associate) on 1 February 1992
 Redesignated 78th Air Refueling Squadron on 1 October 1994

Assignments
 435th Troop Carrier Group, 25 February 1943 – 15 November 1945
 435th Troop Carrier Group, 17 July 1947 – 1 December 1952
 435th Troop Carrier Group, 1 December 1952 – 24 March 1954
 435th Troop Carrier Group, 1 April 1955 – 16 November 1957
 435th Troop Carrier Wing, 8 May 1959
 917th Troop Carrier Group (later 917th Air Transport Group, 917th Military Airlift Group, 917th Special Operations Group), 17 January 1963 – 1 October 1973
 452d Air Refueling Wing, 1 November 1981
 98th Air Refueling Group, 1 October 1987
 98th Operations Group, 1 August 1992
 514th Operations Group, 1 October 1994 – present

Stations 

 Bowman Field, Kentucky, 25 February 1943
 Sedalia Army Air Field, Missouri, 4 May 1943
 Pope Field, North Carolina, 2 July 1943
 Baer Field, Indiana, 9–13 October 1943
 RAF Langar (AAF-490), England, 4 November 1943
 RAF Welford (AAF-474), England, January 1944
 Detachment operated from Tarquinia Airfield, Italy, 20 July – 23 August 1944
 Bretigny Airfield (A-48), France, 19 February – June 1945
 Baer Field, Indiana, 5 August 1945

 Kellogg Field, Michigan, 23 August – 15 November 1945
 Imeson Field, Jacksonville, Florida, 17 July 1947
 Miami International Airport, Florida, 26 June 1949 – 1 December 1952
 Miami International Airport, Florida, 1 December 1952 – 24 March 1954
 Orlando Air Force Base, Florida, 1 April 1955 – 16 November 1957
 Bates Field, Alabama, 8 May 1959
 Deployed at Donaldson Air Force Base, South Carolina, 14–28 August 1960
 Barksdale Air Force Base, Louisiana, 8 May 1961 – 1 October 1973
 Barksdale Air Force Base, Louisiana, 1 November 1981
 McGuire Air Force Base, New Jersey, 1 October 1994 – present

Aircraft

 Douglas C-53 Skytrooper (1943–1945)
 Douglas C-47 Skytrain (1943–1945)
 Waco CG-4 (1943–1945)
 Airspeed Horsa (1943–1945)
 Curtiss C-46 Commando (1944–1945, 1947–1951, 1952–1954, 1955–1957)

 Fairchild C-119 Flying Boxcar (1951–1952, 1959–1961)
 Douglas C-124 Globemaster II (1961–1972)
 Cessna A-37 Dragonfly (1972–1973)
 McDonnell Douglas KC-10 Extender (1981–2021)
Boeing KC-46A Pegasus (2021-present)

References

Notes

Bibliography

 
 
 
 
 
 
 

Military units and formations in New Jersey
078